The Allenby Bridge (English name;  Gesher Allenby), known officially in Jordan as the King Hussein Bridge ( Jisr al-Malek Hussein), and also called Al-Karameh Bridge by Palestinian Arabs, is a bridge that crosses the Jordan River near the city of Jericho, and connects the West Bank with Jordan. The bridge is currently the sole designated exit/entry point for West Bank Palestinians traveling abroad.

Being 381 meters (1,250 ft) below sea level, it is the lowest fixed water crossing in the world.

History
In 1885 the Ottoman government of the Mutasarrifate of Jerusalem built a bridge at this site.

In 1918 British general Edmund Allenby built a bridge over the remnant of the Ottoman predecessor. It was first destroyed by the 1927 Jericho earthquake, when it fell apart and collapsed into the river.

It was destroyed again in the Night of the bridges operation by Palmach on 16 June 1946, thus severing one of the main overland connections between Mandatory Palestine and Transjordan. The next destruction occurred during the 1967 Six-Day War, after which was replaced in 1968 with a temporary truss-type bridge. In 1994, subsequent to the Israel-Jordan peace treaty, a new modern paved crossing was constructed adjacent to the older wooden one with the aid of the Japanese Government.

Allenby Bridge border crossing 
Since the 1994 Israel–Jordan peace treaty, the Allenby Bridge Terminal is operated by the Israel Airports Authority. It serves as a border crossing between the west and east banks of the Jordan River. The Jordanian authorities recognize the bridge as an international border entry point, but neither grant entry visas to foreign passport holders at this crossing, unlike the country's other border crossings with Israel, nor stamp the passports of departing travelers. Palestinians traveling abroad can use Allenby Bridge to exit the West Bank into Jordan and then use the Queen Alia International Airport in Amman to fly abroad. Travel permits from both Israeli and Jordanian authorities are required, with varied stringency depending on the prevailing political situation.

Israeli citizens are not permitted to use the terminal, except Israeli Muslims making a pilgrimage to Mecca to perform the Hajj and Umrah. Such pilgrims were allowed to use the Allenby Bridge crossing for the first time in 1978, after Jordan and Saudi Arabia permitted Israeli Arabs to join the hajj in 1977. Tourists who wish to travel to Jordan may have to be in possession of a visa from Jordan in advance, depending on their nationality. Tourists and inhabitants of East Jerusalem may travel directly to an Israeli terminal, although Palestinians from the West Bank have to start the departure procedure at the special Palestinian border terminal in Jericho city.

The Jordanian side of the bridge has a branch of the Bank of Jordan for the exchange of currencies.

In the arts
The Allenby crossing is the locus of a 1971 song by Nurit Hirsh, Gesher Bailey (Bailey bridge - referring to the temporary truss bridge) sung by Yehoram Gaon.

See also

Death of Raed Zeiter

References

External links

 US Consular Information Sheet - Jordan
 US Consular Information Sheet - Israel, the West Bank and Gaza
 Crossing the River Jordan (Jordan River Foundation)
 Allenby Border Terminal info
 Original bridge, circa 1893, burnt by the Turks during WWI

Bridges completed in 1968
Bridges in Jordan
Bridges over the Jordan River
Jordan–West Bank border crossings
Toll bridges